Policy appliances are technical control and logging mechanisms to enforce or reconcile policy rules (information use rules) and to ensure accountability in information systems.   Policy appliances can be used to enforce policy or other systems constraints within and among trusted systems.  

The emerging global information society consists of many heterogeneous but interconnected systems that are governed or managed according to different policies, rules, or principles that meet local information management needs.  For example, systems may be subject to different international, national or other political subdivision information disclosure or privacy laws; or different information management or security policies among or between government agencies, government and private sector information systems, or producers and consumers of proprietary information or intellectual property, etc.   

This interconnected network of systems (for which the Internet as we currently know it serves as the transport layer) increasingly requires dynamic agreement (negotiation) and technical mediation as to which policies will govern information as it flows between or among systems (that is, what use policies will govern what information goes where, under what constraints, and who has access to it for what purposes, etc.).  The alternative to developing these mediating mechanisms to provide automated policy negotiation and enforcement across interconnection between disparate systems is the increased "balkanization" or fragmentation of the Internet.  

Because no single policy can govern all systems or information needs, methods of reconciling differences between systems and then enforcing and monitoring agreed policies are necessary in order to share useful information and keep systems interconnected.  Current static methods based on all-or-nothing access control are insufficient to meet variable information production and consumption needs, particularly when there are potentially competing policies (for example, the conflict between disclosure and privacy laws) that are contextually dependent.  Access control mechanisms that simply control who has access between systems result in stove-piped information silos, "walled gardens", and increased network fragmentation.  Policy appliance is a general term to describe dynamic, contextually-aware control mechanisms currently being researched and developed to enforce use policies between systems.

Although policy development and enforcement itself is a political or cultural process, not a technological one, technical systems architecture can be used to determine what policy opportunities exist by controlling the terms under which information is exchanged, or applications behave, across systems.  In order to maintain the open transport, end-to-end principles embedded in the current Internet design – that is, to avoid hard-coding policy solutions in the transport layer or using strict access control regimes to segment the network – policy appliances are required to mediate between systems to facilitate information sharing, data exchange, and management process interoperability.

Policy appliances -- a generic term referring to any form of middleware that manages policy rules -- can mediate between data owners or producers, data aggregators, and data users, and among heterogeneous institutional systems or networks, to enforce, reconcile, and monitor agreed information management policies and laws across system (or between jurisdictions) with divergent information policies or needs.  Policy appliances can interact with smart data (data that carries with it contextual relevant terms for its own use), intelligent agents (queries that are self-credentialed, authenticating, or contextually adaptive), or context-aware applications to control information flows, protect security and confidentiality, and maintain privacy.  

Policy appliances support policy-based information management processes by enabling rules-based processing, selective disclosure, and accountability and oversight. 

Examples of policy appliance technologies for rules-based processing include analytic filters, contextual search, semantic programs, labeling and wrapper tools, and DRM, among others; policy appliance technologies for selective disclosure include anonymization, content personalization, subscription and publishing tools, among others; and, policy appliance technologies for accountability and oversight include authentication, authorization, immutable and non-repudiable logging, and audit tools, among others.

Control and accountability over policy appliances between competing systems is becoming a key determinant in policy implementation and enforcement, and will continue to be subject to ongoing international and national political, corporate and bureaucratic struggle.  Transparency, together with immutable and non-repudiable logs, are necessary to ensure accountability and compliance for both political, operational and civil liberties policy needs.  Increasingly, international and national information policy and law will need to rely on technical means of enforcement and accountability through policy appliances.

References

See also

See also,  Technology, Security, and Privacy:  The Fear of Frankenstein, the Mythology of Privacy, and the Lessons of King Ludd, 7 Yale J. L. & Tech. 123; 9 Intl. J. Comm. L. & Pol'y 8 (2004) at 56-58 (discussing “privacy appliances” to enforce rules and provide accountability).   The concept of privacy appliances originated with the DARPA Total Information Awareness project.  See Presentation by Dr. John Poindexter, Director, Information Awareness Office (IAO), DARPA, at DARPA-Tech 2002 Conference, Anaheim, CA (Aug. 2, 2002); ISAT 2002 Study, Security with Privacy (Dec. 13, 2002); and IAO Report to Congress regarding the Terrorism Information Awareness Program at A-13 (May 20, 2003) in response to Consolidated Appropriations Resolution, 2003, No.108-7, Division M, §111(b) [signed Feb.  20, 2003].

Information systems